Ángel Luis Delgado Astacio (born November 20, 1994) is a Dominican professional basketball player for Pınar Karşıyaka of the Basketbol Süper Ligi (BSL). He played college basketball for the Seton Hall Pirates. Delgado has also played on the Dominican national team.

College career
Delgado committed to play college basketball with the Pirates of Seton Hall University on August 16, 2013, after receiving offers from Florida State, Fordham, Virginia, among others. Delgado was elected Rookie of the Year of the Big East Conference in the 2014-15 season, after averaging 9.3 points and a conference-high 9.9 rebounds per game.

In his junior year at Seton Hall, Delgado lead the NCAA in rebounds with 13.1 rebounds per game that season to go along with 15.2 points per game. He was one assist shy of a triple double in the Big East Tournament matchup versus Marquette. He was named to the First Team All-Big East and led Seton Hall to a 21-12 overall mark and 10-8 record in the Big East. Delgado entered the 2017 NBA draft without an agent, although decided to return to Seton Hall for his senior year of college after not being invited to the NBA Combine.

Delgado broke Derrick Coleman's record for most rebounds in the Big East with a 19-rebound performance against DePaul on January 27, 2018. In his final game in college, an 83-79 loss to Kansas in the Round of 32 of the NCAA Tournament, he had 24 points and 23 rebounds. As a senior, Delgado averaged 13.6 points, 11.8 rebounds and 2.8 assists per game. He won the Kareem Abdul-Jabbar Award for top center and Haggerty Award for top New York-area player. In his career at Seton Hall he pulled down 1,432 rebounds. He participated in the 2018 Portsmouth Invitational Tournament.

Professional career

Los Angeles Clippers (2018–2019)
After being undrafted in the 2018 NBA draft, Delgado signed a two-way contract with the Los Angeles Clippers on July 6, 2018. For the 2018–19 season, he will split his playing time between the Clippers and their NBA G League affiliate, the Agua Caliente Clippers. On January 5, 2019, Delgado grabbed an NBA G League-record 31 rebounds for the Clippers in a 112–94 win over the Oklahoma City Blue. He broke a record previously set by Jack Cooley back in 2015 under the NBA D-League. Delgado made his NBA debut on February 7, recording 3 points, 4 rebounds, and 1 steal in 14 minutes of action in a blowout 116–92 loss to the Indiana Pacers.

Beijing Royal Fighters (2019)
On August 8, 2019, Delgado signed with the Beijing Royal Fighters of the Chinese Basketball Association. On October 16, 2019, he parted ways with the Royal Fighters before appearing in a game for them.

Hapoel Holon (2019–2020)
On December 2, 2019, Delgado signed with Hapoel Holon of the Israeli Premier League. He appeared in nine games for Holon in the Basketball Champions League and Israeli League, averaging 8.6 points and 5.7 rebounds in 17.3 minutes of action.

On January 14, 2020, Delgado parted ways with Holon due to personal reasons.

Sioux Falls Skyforce (2020)
On March 6, 2020, the Sioux Falls Skyforce announced that they had acquired Delgado off waivers. In two games, he averaged 13.5 points, six rebounds, 1.5 assists and 1.5 steals per game.

Movistar Estudiantes (2020–2021)
On July 18, 2020, the Movistar Estudiantes announced that they had added Delgado.

Bilbao Basket (2021–2022)
On July 19, 2021, he has signed with Bilbao Basket of the Liga ACB.

Pınar Karşıyaka (2022–present)
On June 23, 2022, he has signed with Pınar Karşıyaka of the Basketbol Süper Ligi.

National team career
Delgado represented the Dominican Republic at the 2016 Centrobasket, where he won a bronze medal. He averaged 12.5 points per game, 10th best in the tournament, and 7.5 rebounds per game, sixth best. Delgado later played in the 2017 FIBA AmeriCup, appearing in three games and, averaging 8.7 points and 8.3 rebounds in 23.5 minutes per game.

Career statistics

Regular season 

|-
| style="text-align:left;"| 
| style="text-align:left;"| L.A. Clippers
| 2 || 0 || 7.5 || .200 || – || .500 || 2.0 || .0 || .5 || .0 || 1.5
|- class="sortbottom"
| style="text-align:center;" colspan="2"| Career
| 2 || 0 || 7.5 || .200 || – || .500 || 2.0 || .0 || .5 || .0 || 1.5

See also

 List of NCAA Division I men's basketball career rebounding leaders

References

External links
 
 Seton Hall Pirates bio
 RealGM profile

1994 births
Living people
Agua Caliente Clippers players
Bilbao Basket players
CB Estudiantes players
Centers (basketball)
Dominican Republic expatriate basketball people in Spain
Dominican Republic expatriate basketball people in the United States
Dominican Republic men's basketball players
Hapoel Holon players
Karşıyaka basketball players
Liga ACB players
Los Angeles Clippers players
National Basketball Association players from the Dominican Republic
People from Bajos de Haina
Seton Hall Pirates men's basketball players
The Patrick School alumni
Undrafted National Basketball Association players